Duck Dodgers is an American animated television series based on the 1953 theatrical animated short film of the same name. It was produced by Warner Bros. Animation from 2003 to 2005. Duck Dodgers is a comic science fiction series, featuring the Looney Tunes characters in metafictional roles, with the character Daffy Duck as the title character. It originally aired on Cartoon Network. Reruns of the show continued on Boomerang until March 1, 2010.

Concept
Though primarily based around the original Duck Dodgers short (which is set in roughly 2350 AD), the series also takes visual and thematic cues from other Looney Tunes shorts, with other Looney Tunes characters appearing in the series, albeit adapted to fit within the show's universe. For example, Yosemite Sam becomes "K'chutha Sa'am", a parody of Klingons in Star Trek, Elmer Fudd becomes "The Fudd", a parasitic mind-altering alien disease, (a combination of the Flood and the Borg), Wile E. Coyote was a Predator-like alien hunter. Also appearing in the show were Witch Hazel, Count Bloodcount, Goofy Gophers, Nasty Canasta, Taz, Rocky and Mugsy, the Crusher, "Shropshire Slasher", Michigan J. Frog, Ralph Phillips, Egghead Junior, and the unnamed evil scientist who owned Gossamer.

Theme songs
The show's theme song (arranged by the Flaming Lips) is sung by Tom Jones, in a style reminiscent of the theme from the James Bond film Thunderball. A caricature of Jones also appears in the second-season episode "Talent Show A Go-Go", singing his signature song, "It's Not Unusual". Dave Mustaine of the thrash metal band Megadeth was featured in the third-season episode "In Space, No One Can Hear You Rock", with the band performing the song "Back in the Day" from their 2004 album The System Has Failed.

Accolades
Duck Dodgers was nominated in 2004 Annie Award for Outstanding Achievement in an Animated Television Production Produced For Children, Music in an Animated Television Production, Production Design in an Animated Television Production, and Voice Acting in an Animated Television Production. It won the Annie award in 2004, for Music in an Animated Television Production, music by Robert J. Kral. It was also nominated for an Emmy Award for Outstanding Sound Editing – Live Action and Animation and Special Class Animated Program in 2004, and again in 2005. It later won for Outstanding Performer in an Animated Program—Joe Alaskey. The series ended production in 2005 after its third season.

Characters

Galactic Protectorate
 Duck Dodgers (voiced by Joe Alaskey) – A hapless soul that was accidentally frozen for over three centuries for unknown reasons. He was later revived by Dr. I.Q. Hi in the 24½th century. Dodgers is arrogant, lazy, gullible, and not particularly intelligent. However, throughout the series, he occasionally displays surprisingly high levels of heroism and competence, suggesting that he is not quite as daft as he appears to be, although he usually succeeds through sheer dumb luck and the work of the Eager Young Space Cadet. Though he doesn't show it often, Dodgers cares deeply for his cadet, even though he often demeans and puts him through humiliating situations. He is played by Daffy Duck.
 The Eager Young Space Cadet (voiced by Bob Bergen) – Looks up to Dodgers, seeing him as a father-figure in many ways. He is utterly loyal to Dodgers and doesn't doubt a word he says. Despite being much smarter than his so-called hero, he lets him give all the orders. Dodgers cares deeply for his Cadet though he rarely shows it, and often tries to take credit for the Cadet's work. Dodgers relies heavily on the Cadet's assistance and would likely fail most missions without it. The Cadet is also fairly successful as a ladies man, often being the one who gets the girl Dodgers swoons over. He graduated summa cum laude from the Protectorate Academy. The Cadet is played by Porky Pig.
 Dr. I.Q. Hi (voiced by Richard McGonagle) – The overweight scientist that revived Dodgers after being frozen for three centuries. Serious and hard-working, he is often irritated and frustrated with Dodgers' incompetent side, and doubts that Dodgers truly was a 21st-century hero. In addition to being a hard-working scientist, he constantly wears gloves that stretch up his arm, ending at his elbow and leaving a gap between his fingertips and the glove's tips (which he did not wear in the 1953 short).
 Captain Star Johnson (voiced by John O'Hurley) – Johnson is a rival captain of Dodgers' in the Galactic Protectorate. Gifted with a university education, Johnson has a Flash Gordon-like personality about him, and once took Dodgers to court over his incompetence. Since then, Johnson has been involved in freeing Mars from the military coup by General Z9, and searching for gangsters when Dodgers went missing for a brief period of time. He also played rocketball in college.
 Bigfoot (voiced by Michael Patrick McGill) – In "The Six Wazillion Dollar Duck" (a parody of The Six Million Dollar Man), it was revealed that Bigfoot worked for the Protectorate as a Maintenance Supervisor and was also the first (thing) to receive cyborganic implants (Steve Boston was the first man to receive them, but before The Protectorate tested it on someone with a similar anatomy). These implants enhanced his combat abilities, as he is able to hold off several centurions before they bait and trapped him with pie. He is seemingly very uneducated as the only two words he says are "Duck" and "Stereo".

The Martian Empire
 Queen Tyr'ahnee (voiced by Tia Carrere) – The ruler of Mars and the main antagonist of the series. Despite being his enemy, she is infatuated with Dodgers and, just like Cadet, believes him to be a true hero. Her outfits are reminiscent of Martian Princesses in the John Carter of Mars book series.
 Martian Commander X-2 (voiced by Joe Alaskey) – The confident commander of the Martian military who is Dodgers' archenemy. He is infatuated with the Martian Queen that he serves, and considers Dodgers more of a nuisance than a true enemy. He once essentially created Duck Dodgers by going back in time and making him a hero so as to not be proven wrong by the Queen (the Queen did figure it out and was punished). He is played by Marvin the Martian.
 K-9 (voiced by Frank Welker) – Martian Commander X-2's dog.
 Centurion Robots (voiced by Michael Dorn) – The faithful robotic servants of the Mars Empire. They appear to be sentient, and make up a large portion of the Imperial Army, while the organic Martians act as officers. This is a homage to the Cylon Centurions of Battlestar Galactica. Dorn's casting may be a nod to his popular sci-fi character Worf from Star Trek: The Next Generation.
 Instant Martians – Strange bird-like Martian beings with purple hair. They were used briefly as an escape ploy by Commander X-2. They emerge from minuscule seeds that are activated upon contact with water. They first appeared in the 1958 cartoon Hare-Way to the Stars, in which the Martian Commander ordered them to capture Bugs Bunny.

Episodes

Voice cast
 Joe Alaskey – (Daffy Duck as) Duck Dodgers, (Marvin the Martian as) Martian Commander X-2, Beaky Buzzard, Drake Darkstar, Hubie and Bertie, Rocky, Muttley
 Bob Bergen – (Porky Pig as) the Eager, Young Space Cadet
 Richard McGonagle – Dr. I.Q. Hi
 Tia Carrere – Queen Tyr'ahnee
 Michael Dorn – Centurion Robots, Captain Long, Klunkin Warrior
 John O'Hurley – Captain Star Johnson

Home media
Warner Home Video released Duck Dodgers – The Complete First Season: Dark Side of the Duck to DVD on February 19, 2013, Duck Dodgers – The Complete Second Season: Deep Space Duck on July 23, 2013, and Duck Dodgers - The Complete Third Season on January 28, 2020. Unlike the previous 2 seasons released on DVD the 3rd was released on a DVD-R. The complete series will be released on Blu-ray on March 28, 2023. The Blu-ray set will also include the original 1953 short Duck Dodgers in the 24½th Century as a bonus feature.

See also

 Looney Tunes
 Daffy Duck
 Duck Dodgers
 List of Duck Dodgers characters

References

External links

 

Duck Dodgers
2003 American television series debuts
2005 American television series endings
2000s American animated television series
2000s American comic science fiction television series
American animated television spin-offs
American children's animated comic science fiction television series
American children's animated space adventure television series
Animated television series about ducks
Animated television series about extraterrestrial life
Animated television series about pigs
Boomerang (TV network) original programming
Cartoon Network original programming
English-language television shows
Television series about impact events
Looney Tunes television series
Television about Bigfoot
Television series by Warner Bros. Animation
Television series set in the 24th century
Television series set in the future
Television series set on fictional planets
Vampires in animated television